The African Congress for Renewal–Dunya (CAR-Dunya) was a political party in Benin.

History

The party was established on 11 July 1998 as a breakaway from the Action Front for Renewal and Development. In the 1999 elections it received 3.3% of the vote, winning three seats. Gabé Orou Sego Orou, Albert Sinatoko and Saley Saka became MPs for the party.

References

Defunct political parties in Benin
Political parties established in 1998
1998 establishments in Benin
Political parties with year of disestablishment missing